The Monumento ai Caduti is a Fascist era monument located in the center of Piazza San Francesco in Pistoia, region of Tuscany, Italy. The monument was meant to recall those fallen in the battles of World War I between 1915-1918. While completed some years before, the bronze statue was only installed in 1926 with the King in attendance. The bronze statue depicts a muscular, semi nude, semi-recumbent man sheltering a statue of victory as he glares to the distance. The statue is on a marble base with flanking bas-reliefs depicting a Winged victory and a mother and child sharing bundles of wheat (fasce). The sculptor, Silvio Carnevari (1891-1953) would go on to sculpt depictions of athletes for the Stadio Mussolini] in Rome. Many of this statues, including The Pugilist and his Monument to Victory (Monument to those fallen in the wars of Africa) at Civita Castellana, also focus on the athletic man in combat.

References

Buildings and structures in Pistoia
Monuments and memorials in Tuscany
World War I memorials in Italy
Italian fascist architecture
Buildings and structures completed in 1925